Klępczewo  (German Klemzow) is a village in the administrative district of Gmina Świdwin, within Świdwin County, West Pomeranian Voivodeship, in north-western Poland.

The village has a population of 850.

References

Villages in Świdwin County